Klymaxx is the fourth studio album by Klymaxx, released in 1986 (see 1986 in music).

Klymaxx gained airplay on MTV, VH1 and BET with the release of their single "Man Size Love". The song reached #43 on the R&B chart, #15 on the Billboard Hot 100, and #18 on the Billboard Dance Chart.

The second single "Sexy" would become a moderate hit single. The song reached #18 on the R&B chart.

The third single "I'd Still Say Yes" was the biggest hit on the album, reaching #18 on the Billboard Hot 100 and #7 on the R&B chart, and #8 on the Adult Contemporary chart. The single was certified gold.

The fourth and final single was the dance hit "Divas Need Love Too", which was a moderate hit for Klymaxx. It only reached #14 on the R&B chart.

The album would go on to reach #98 on the Billboard 200 and #25 on the R&B Album Chart. The album is certified Gold.

Track listing
"Sexy" (B. Cooper) - 7:34
"Fab Attack" (B. Cooper, C. Cooley, J. Irby, Marquis Dair, Sami McKinney) - 5:33
"Divas Need Love Too" (C. Cooper, Vincent Brantley, Rick Timas) - 5:16
"I'd Still Say Yes" (Babyface, J. Irby, Greg Scelsa) - 4:40
"Fashion" (B. Cooper, Mike Hightower) - 6:36
"Danger Zone" (J. Irby, Chuck Gentry) - 4:32
"Long Distance Love Affair" (Scott Durbin) - 3:22
"Come Back" (L. Malsby) - 6:28
"Man Size Love" (Rod Temperton) - 5:40

Singles released
"Man Size Love"
"Sexy"
"I'd Still Say Yes"
"Divas Need Love Too"

Personnel
 Lorena Porter Shelby – lead vocals (1, 3, 5, 6, 8, 9), backing vocals (1-9), rap (2)
 Cheryl Cooley – guitars, backing vocals (1-9), guitar solo (2, 6), rap (2)
 Robbin Grider – guitars, keyboards, backing vocals (1-9), synthesizer programming (2), rap (2), acoustic guitar (4)
 Lynn Malsby – keyboards, backing vocals (1-9), rap (2), synthesizer programming (6, 7)
 Joyce "Fenderella" Irby – bass, backing vocals (1-9), lead vocals (2, 4, 6, 7, 8), 
 Bernadette Cooper – drums, percussion, lead rap (1, 2, 5), backing vocals (1-9)

Additional Personnel
 Marquis Dair – backing vocals (2)
 Siedah Garrett – backing vocals (3)
 Vincent Bradley – arrangements (3)
 Rick Timas – arrangements (3)
 Howard Hewett – additional lead vocals (4)
 The Waters – backing vocals (4, 7, 9)
 Craig Cooper – rhythm and string arrangements (4, 7), synthesizer programming (5)
 Norman Beavers – synthesizer programming (6, 7)
 Rod Temperton – arrangements (9)

Production 
 Bernadette Cooper – producer (1, 3, 5)
 Joyce "Fenderella" Irby – producer (1, 2, 4-7)
 George Clinton – co-producer (1)
 Vincent Bradley – producer (3)
 Rick Timas – producer (3)
 Lynn Malsby – producer (8)
 Stephen Shockley – producer (8)
 Dick Rudolph – producer (9)
 Bruce Sweedin – producer (9), engineer
 Rod Temperton – producer (9)
 Ron Sweeney – executive producer, management 
 Regina Griffey – A&R coordinator 
 Brenda Patrick – A&R direction
 Glenn Feit – engineer
 Michael Frenke – engineer
 Jon Gass – engineer, mixing 
 Steve Hodge – engineer
 Leanard Jackson – engineer, mixing
 Kathy Botich – assistant engineer
 Janine Cirills – assistant engineer 
 Ron DaSilva – assistant engineer
 Steve Krause – assistant engineer
 John Payne – assistant engineer
 Alan Skidmore – assistant engineer 
 Taavi Mote – remix (1, 2), mixing 
 Louis Silas, Jr. – remix (1, 2)
 Hill Swimmer – mixing 
 Laura Livingston – mix assistant 
 Adrian Trujillo – mix assistant
 Jeff Adamoff – art direction 
 September – design 
 Steve Hall – mastering 
 Bobby Holland – photography 
Studios
 Recorded at Galaxy Sound Studios, Wide Tracks and Hollywood Central Recorders (Hollywood, California); Image Recording Studios and Studio Masters (Los Angeles, California); O'Henry Sound Studios (Burbank, California); Sound Solution (Santa Monica, California); 54 East Sound Recorders (Pasadena, California).
 Mixed at Encore Studios (Burbank, California); Galaxy Sound Studios and Larrabee Sound Studios (Hollywood, California); Lion Share Recording Studio (Los Angeles, California).
 Mastered at Future Disc (North Hollywood, California).

Charts

Weekly charts

Year-end charts

References

External links
Klymaxx at Discogs

1986 albums
Klymaxx albums
MCA Records albums